Allen E. Stebbins (December 8, 1872 – January 25, 1941) was an American politician who served as the 39th lieutenant governor of Michigan from 1933 to 1935.

References

1872 births
1941 deaths
Lieutenant Governors of Michigan
Michigan Democrats
20th-century American politicians